"Art Czars" is the debut 7" single by Canadian rock duo Japandroids. It was released by Polyvinyl Record Co. on April 12, 2010. The initial pressing was limited to 2000 copies on clear vinyl. It is currently out-of-print.

Track listing

 "Art Czars" - 4:02
 "Racer-X" (Big Black cover) - 3:17

References 

2010 singles
Japandroids songs
2010 songs
Polyvinyl Record Co. singles